Louis Sachar (born March 20, 1954) is an American young-adult mystery-comedy author. He is best known for the Wayside School series and the novel Holes.

Holes won the 1998 U.S. National Book Award for Young People's Literature
and the 1999 Newbery Medal for the year's "most distinguished contribution to American literature for children".
In 2013, it was ranked sixth among all children's novels in a survey published by School Library Journal.

Biography
Sachar was born to a religious Jewish family in East Meadow, New York. As a child, he attended Hebrew school and Sunday school. After graduating from Tustin High School, Sachar attended Antioch College for a semester before transferring to University of California, Berkeley, during which time he began helping at an elementary school in return for three college credits. Sachar later recalled,

Sachar graduated from UC Berkeley in 1976 with a degree in Economics, and began working on Sideways Stories From Wayside School, a children's book set at an elementary school with supernatural elements. Although the book's students were named after children from Hillside and there is a presumably autobiographical character named "Louis the Yard Teacher," Sachar has said that he draws very little from personal experience, stating that ". ... my personal experiences are kind of boring. I have to make up what I put in my books."

Sachar wrote the book at night over the course of nine months, during which he worked during the day in a Connecticut sweater warehouse. After being fired from the warehouse, Sachar decided to go to law school, around which time Sideways Stories From Wayside School was accepted for publication. The book was released in 1978; though it was not widely distributed and subsequently did not sell very well, Sachar began to accumulate a fan base among young readers. Sachar graduated from University of California, Hastings College of the Law in 1980 and did part-time legal work while continuing to write children's books. By 1989, his books were selling well enough that Sachar was able to begin writing full-time.

Sachar married Carla Askew, an elementary school counselor, in 1985. They live in Austin, Texas, and have a daughter, Sherre, born January 19, 1987. Sachar has mentioned both his wife and daughter in his books; Carla was the inspiration for the counselor in There's a Boy in the Girls' Bathroom (1988), and Stanley's lawyer in Holes.

When asked about whether he thought children have changed over the years, Sachar responded: "I've actually been writing since 1976, and my first book is still in print and doing very well."

Film and television
On April 11, 2003, Disney's film adaptation of Holes was released, which earned $71.4 million worldwide. Sachar himself wrote the film's screenplay. On November 19, 2005, the Wayside School series was adapted into an animated direct-to-video special. Two years later, it became a television series with two seasons, airing on the Canadian Teletoon and Nickelodeon in the U.S.

Works
Wayside School
 Sideways Stories from Wayside School (1978)
 Wayside School is Falling Down (1989)
 Sideways Arithmetic From Wayside School (1989)
 More Sideways Arithmetic From Wayside School (1994)
 Wayside School Gets A Little Stranger (1995)
 Wayside School Beneath the Cloud of Doom (2020)

Marvin Redpost
 Kidnapped at Birth? (1992)
 Why Pick on Me? (1993)
 Is He a Girl? (1993)
 Alone In His Teacher's House (1994)
 Class President (1999)
 A Flying Birthday Cake? (1999)
 Super Fast Out of Control! (2000)
 A Magic Crystal? (2000)

Holes series' Holes (1998) — winner of the National Book Award and Newbery Medal
 Stanley Yelnats' Survival Guide to Camp Green Lake (2003)
 Small Steps (2006)

Other books
 Johnny's in the Basement (1981)
 Someday Angeline (1983)
 Sixth Grade Secrets (1987) (known as Pig City in the UK)
 There's a Boy in the Girls' Bathroom (1987)
 The Boy Who Lost His Face (1989)
 Dogs Don't Tell Jokes (1991)
 The Cardturner (2010)
 Captain Tory (2011) (collected in The Chronicles of Harris Burdick Fourteen Amazing Authors Tell the Tales)
 Fuzzy Mud (2015)

References

External links

 
  – as of April 2020, dedicated to the release of Wayside School Beneath the Cloud of Doom''
 
 
 

1954 births
American children's writers
Jewish American writers
Jewish American artists
Newbery Medal winners
National Book Award for Young People's Literature winners
University of California, Berkeley alumni
University of California, Hastings College of the Law alumni
Antioch College alumni
People from East Meadow, New York
Living people
Writers from Austin, Texas
21st-century American Jews